Karine Turcotte (born 28 August 1978) is a Canadian weightlifter.

Turcotte competed at the 2002 Commonwealth Games where she won silver medals in the 48kg snatch, 48kg clean and jerk and 48kg total events.

She also competed at the 2001 World Weightlifting Championships in the 48 kg event.

Her sister, Maryse Turcotte, is also a weightlifter.

References

1978 births
Living people
Canadian female weightlifters
Weightlifters at the 2002 Commonwealth Games
Commonwealth Games silver medallists for Canada
Commonwealth Games medallists in weightlifting
20th-century Canadian women
21st-century Canadian women
Medallists at the 2002 Commonwealth Games